Alfred Jean Halou (born in Blois in 1875 and died in Paris in 1939) was a French sculptor.

He followed the class of Alexandre Falguière at the École des Beaux Arts and was also a pupil of Auguste Rodin. He was then part of the band named "la bande à Schnegg", including Lucien Schnegg, Antoine Bourdelle, Charles Despiau, Robert Wlérick, Léon-Ernest Drivier, François Pompon, Louis Dejean, Charles Malfray, Auguste de Niederhausern, Henry Arnold, Jane Poupelet and Yvonne Serruys.

Main works
 The 1870 monument commemorating the War, in Blois
 Ronde-Bosse, statue, a young woman kneeling, Saint-Maurice, Val-de-Marne

References

1875 births
1939 deaths
Artists from Blois
20th-century French sculptors
French male sculptors